The 2019 AFC Annual Awards were the awards for football players and coaches of the year in Asia. The award ceremony was held in Hong Kong on 2 December 2019.

Winners 

The nominees were announced on 15 November 2019.

Men

Asian Footballer of the Year

International players

Coach of the Year

Futsal Player

Young Player

Women

Asian Footballer of the Year

Coach of the Year

Young Player

Other Awards

AFC Member Association of the Year (Inspiring)

AFC Member Association of the Year (Developing)

AFC Member Association of the Year (Aspiring)

AFC President Recognition Awards for Grassroots Football (Inspiring)

AFC President Recognition Awards for Grassroots Football (Developing)

AFC President Recognition Awards for Grassroots Football (Aspiring)

See also 
 Asian Footballer of the Year
 Asian Young Footballer of the Year

References

External links 
 Official page

Asian Football Confederation trophies and awards
AFC Annual Award, 2019